Harum is a surname. Notable people with the surname include:
Gisela Harum, Austrian chess master

See also 
 Harem (disambiguation)
 Harum Scarum, a 1965 musical comedy film starring Elvis Presley and the soundtrack album with the same name by Elvis Presley
Procol Harum, a British rock band